Harry Schoenberg (born 21 February 2001) is an Australian rules footballer who plays for the Adelaide Crows in the Australian Football League (AFL). He was recruited by the Adelaide Crows with the 24th draft pick in the 2019 AFL draft.

Early football
Schoenberg played for the Woodville-West Torrens Football Club for the 2019 season in the SANFL. In that season he played a total of 8 games and kicked 6 goals. Schoenberg also represented South Australia in the AFL Under 18 Championships in 2019. He won the South Australian Most Valuable Player award and was named in the U18 All Australian side. 

He grew up in the South Australian country town of Marrabel and attended Prince Alfred College as a boarder. He played junior community football for the Mintaro-Manoora Eagles in the North Eastern Football League in the Clare Valley in South Australia.

AFL career
Schoenberg debuted for the Crows' fifty-one point loss to the Melbourne Demons in the 10th round of the 2020 AFL season . On debut, Schoenberg picked up 12 disposals, 2 marks and 2 tackles. Schoenberg signed a two-year contract extension in January 2021, keeping him at the club until 2023.

Statistics
 Statistics are correct to the end of Round 23 2021

|- style="background-color: #EAEAEA"
! scope="row" style="text-align:center" | 2020
|style="text-align:center;"|
| 26 || 8 || 3 || 0 || 40 || 54 || 94 || 11 || 15 || 0.4 || 0.0 || 5.0 || 6.8 || 11.8 || 1.4 || 1.9
|- 
| scope="row" style="text-align:center" | 2021
|style="text-align:center;"|
| 26 || 22 || 10 || 9 || 230 || 175 || 405 || 62 || 79 || 0.4 || 0.4 || 10.4 || 7.9 || 18.4 || 2.8 || 3.5
|- style="background:#EAEAEA; font-weight:bold; width:2em"
| scope="row" text-align:center class="sortbottom" colspan=3 | Career
| 30
| 13
| 9
| 270
| 229
| 499
| 73
| 94
| 0.4
| 0.3
| 9.0
| 7.6
| 16.6
| 2.4
| 3.1
|}

References

External links
 
 
 

2001 births
Living people
Adelaide Football Club players
Australian rules footballers from South Australia
Woodville-West Torrens Football Club players